Christian Lee Navarro (born August 21, 1991) is an American actor known for playing Tony Padilla in the Netflix series 13 Reasons Why. He also had a recurring role in the HBO series Vinyl as he works on other movie projects such as Can You Ever Forgive Me? which was released in 2018.

Early life
Navarro was born and raised in Bronx, New York and is of Puerto Rican descent. 

He began acting in 2005 at the age of 14. Initially, he had to struggle for work, starring in commercials and low budget films. His first film was Day of the Dead 2: Contagium. In 2007, he appeared in one episode of Law and Order: Criminal Intent. He also had roles in various TV series, such as Blue Bloods, Taxi Brooklyn, and The Affair. Christian kept appearing in different television series until he landed a recurring role in the TV series Vinyl. He was also selected for the role of John White in the film Run It. In 2015, Navarro got a role in a TV series named Rosewood. His big break came in 2017 when he landed the role of Tony Padilla in 13 Reasons Why.

Filmography

Accolades 
In 2018, the actor received the Rising Star Award at the San Diego International Film Festival.

References

External links
 

1991 births
Living people
American male film actors
American male television actors
American people of Puerto Rican descent
Hispanic and Latino American male actors